Récital 1962, also known as Olympia 1962 and A l'Olympia 1962, is an album from Édith Piaf recorded live on September 27, 1962, at L'Olympia in Paris. It was released on the Columbia label (FSX 143). Jean Leccia conducted the orchestra.

Piaf was in a weakened physical state at the time of the performance, and a doctor watched from the wings. She died the following year at age 47.

The album includes a duet on "A Quoi Ca Sert L'Amour" ("What Good Is Love?") with Théo Sarapo, a 26-year-old singer who she married two weeks later.

Track listing

References

1962 albums
Édith Piaf albums